The Spanish Revolution of 1854, also known by the name Vicalvarada, started with a confrontation between rebel troops under General Leopoldo O'Donnell, 1st Duke of Tetuan and government troops near the village of Vicálvaro.

This incident was followed by a military coup and a popular uprising, which occurred between 28 June and 28 July 1854, during the reign of Isabella II of Spain.

The Spanish Revolution ended the moderate decade (Década moderada) (1844-1854) and started the progressive biennium (Bienio progresista) (1854-1856).

History 

The first steps towards revolution began the 20 February 1854, when militant followers of the Democratic Party, aided by civilians like Eduardo Ruiz Pons, attempted to carry out an uprising in Zaragoza, but failed.

Provoked by the abuse of parliamentary powers by the Crown at the end of the “moderate decade”, the moderates led by General Ramon Maria Narvaez and the "puritan" moderates led by Joaquín Francisco Pacheco and Ríos Rosas joined forces with the progressives headed by General Baldomero Espartero and Salustiano de Olozaga. Together they formed an electoral committee to present candidates together with the goal of preserving the democratic regime being threatened. Similarly, the “puritans”, headed by Ríos Rosas and Pacheco, began talks with military attachés, such as General O’Donnell, and progressives, like, Generals Domingo Dulce and Ros de Olano, in order to organize a revolt with the goal of forcing Queen Isabel II to replace the government headed by Count San Luis - which lacked support from the courts and was solely supported by the crown - with another "liberal conciliation" that would return to the intentions and "spirit" of the 1845 constitution. On 28 June 1845, General O’Donnell brought into motion the revolt, but a skirmish a few days later with royal troops in a village outside of Madrid, Vicalvaro - where the revolution gets its name from, La Vicalvarada, - proved difficult. The battle resulted in no clear victors, though several parties attempted to claim as such. As a result, O’Donnell's forces were pushed back to the Vagando Sea by La Mancha and back into Portugal awaiting the arrival of other military forces adding to the movement. In their pursuit of O’Donnell's retreating forces, the government troops left the city, leaving the capital unguarded - a choice that would later be a deciding factor in the outcome of the revolution. 

Before the chaos of the initial uprising, the military forces heading the movement attempted to gain popular support. General O’Donnell met with General Serrano in Manzanares who convinced him it was necessary to turn around the movement by offering political changes that "weren't originally part of the movement's intentions." Thus, the Manzanares Manifest was born, written by a young Antonio Cánovas del Castillo. It put forth the conservation of the throne, but took away his entourage, and it promised to lower taxes and re-establish the national militia - two long-held aspirations of the progressives and democrats. According to Jorge Vilches, as a result, the conspirators intended to "gather the opposition against the government of Count San Luis and discover more ways to pressure the queen." The Manifest was published 7 July - in which was promised the "liberal renaissance" through the passage of new printing and electoral laws, the summons of the courts, the decentralization of administrative power and re-establishment of the national militia: all classically progressive proposals.

The second phase of what would be called the "revolution of 1854" was led primarily by the progressives and democrats who led the 14 July insurrection in Barcelona - intensified by the aid of laborers - and the 17 July insurrection in Madrid - in which dissemination of copies of the Manzanares Manifest mobilized attack by the people with assaults on the palaces of the Marquis of Salamanca. Such attacks extended to the president, the Count of San Luís, and the Queen Mother, María Cristina de Borbón, who had to take refuge with her children in the East Palace, and finally to the Saldero prison in order to liberate democrats Nicolás María Rivero and Sixto Cámara. The militaristic revolts in Barcelona and Madrid were further seconded in other cities like Valencia and Valladolid - in the latter of which the protest became a peaceful one lead by the chant "more bread, less consumption" which also occurred in other Leonese, Catalan, and Asturian cities., According to other non-corroborating sources, the revolters wanted not only the re-establishment of the national military, but also the suppression of the 1845 moderate constitution and ample amnesty for their political prisoners.There were also uprisings in Zaragoza and Logroño. According to the same sources, the revolution was financed by different economic sectors, and, above all, by the banker Juan Bruil.

On 17 July, before the situation could get worse, the queen dismissed the Count of San Luis substituting him for General Fernando Fernandez de Córdova, forming a government with both progressives and moderates, but yielding the presidency to the Duke of Rivas. This new government only lasted two days until the popular revolt. By 18 July, Madrid was full of barricades - making it impossible for leaders O’Donnell and Serrano to accept the government's compromise. The Duke of Rivas tried to suppress the popular uprising - a choice that would forever name him the "Minister of Shrapnel" - awaiting the return of backup from troops who had left Madrid.

Finally, the queen, perhaps swayed by her mother, decided to call General Baldomero Espartero, who was, at present, retired in Logroño, in order to form a government, whilst also asking General O’Donnell to return to court. To accept this political charge, Espartero summoned the Constituent Court, asking that the Queen Mother María Cristina respond to accusations of corruption and that Isabel publish a manifest acknowledging her errors. The queen accepted all of the conditions and on 26 July she published the following manifest addressed to the public:

	“The appointment of the Duke of Victoria (Espartero) to the position of president of the Minister Council, assured by my total adherence to his ideas, that which are inspired by and addressed to public support and happiness, will be the best choice for everyone and this country moving forward.”

On 28 July, General Espartero, upon his grand entrance in Madrid, lauded by multitudes, hugged his old enemy General O’Donnell. Thus began the progressive period, marching María Cristina de Borbón to exile in France.

Bibliography

References

1854 in Spain
Revolutions in Spain
1854 in politics